The J. Martin Nowland House is a historic house located at 31 Edgemere Road in Quincy, Massachusetts.

Description and history 
This -story wood-frame house was built in 1915 by J. Martin Nowland, a local attorney and developer of the Edgemere Road area. It is one of the better-preserved of a number of similar Craftsman/Bungalow style houses in the area, with wide overhangs, half-timbered stucco appearance, and the thick posts supporting the porch over the front entry.

The house was listed on the National Register of Historic Places on September 20, 1989.

See also
National Register of Historic Places listings in Quincy, Massachusetts

References

Houses completed in 1915
Houses in Quincy, Massachusetts
National Register of Historic Places in Quincy, Massachusetts
Houses on the National Register of Historic Places in Norfolk County, Massachusetts
Bungalow architecture in Massachusetts
American Craftsman architecture in Massachusetts
1915 establishments in Massachusetts